

This is a list of countries ordered by annual per capita consumption of beer. Information not provided for some countries is not given in the available sources.
Note: The row number column is fixed. So you can choose what column to rank by clicking its header to sort it.

* indicates "Beer in COUNTRY or TERRITORY" links.

See also
 List of countries by alcohol consumption

Notes

References

External links
 List of beer production by region/by country
 

Beer consumption

Beer by region
Beer